William Emms (29 January 1930 – 18 February 1993) was an Australian schoolteacher and occasional screenwriter for British television.

Writing
In 1965 he wrote the Doctor Who serial Galaxy 4 and later adapted the script for a Target novelisation. Later scripts for the programme during the 1960s and 1980s were not commissioned. He did however write a Doctor Who gamebook entitled Mission to Venus as part of the Make your own adventure with Doctor Who range.

In a writing career lasting from 1963 to 1980 he contributed to popular shows such as Callan, Ace of Wands, Crown Court, Play of the Month, The Revenue Men, The Expert, Champion House, Redcap, R3, Public Eye, Z-Cars, Homicide and Crossroads.

References

External links

1930 births
1993 deaths
British television writers
British science fiction writers
British soap opera writers
British male screenwriters
Australian soap opera writers
Australian emigrants to England
Australian screenwriters
British male television writers
Australian schoolteachers
20th-century British screenwriters
20th-century Australian screenwriters
Australian male television writers